William Felix Brantley (March 12, 1830 – November 2, 1870) was an American lawyer and Confederate combatant. He served as a Confederate general in the American Civil War, mainly in the Western Theater during the conflict. 

He was ambushed and murdered in central Mississippi in November 1870, reportedly as part of a family feud. His older brother, Dr. John Ransom Brantley, was killed in 1859 in Gonzales, Texas. Their younger brother Arnold Brantley was killed in Greensboro, Mississippi in August 1870; his attackers escaped.

Early life and career
William Felix Brantley was born in 1830 in Greene County, Alabama, but moved with his family to Mississippi while still a child. He was a son of William Brantley, originally from Georgia, and his wife Marina (née Jolly) of Alabama. By 1850 Brantley was studying law in Carroll County, Mississippi. Two years later he began practicing as a lawyer in now non-existent city of Greensboro in Webster County, Mississippi.

On December 27, 1855, Brantley married Cornelia S. Medley, and the couple had three children together. They were: Mary Thomas, born September 5, 1858, in Macon and died June 11, 1943, in St. Louis, Missouri; Joseph Ransom, born September 5, 1859 in Choctaw County and died there on September 19, 1869; and an unnamed infant born in 1861 and died on June 7 of that year. 

By 1860 Brantley was a practicing lawyer in Choctaw County, Mississippi. He and his family lived with one of his brothers, Dr. John Ransom Brantley. In 1861 he represented his county during the Mississippi state secession convention.

Civil War service
When the American Civil War began in 1861, Brantley chose to follow his home state and the Confederate cause. On April 20 he entered his state's forces as a captain in the Mississippi Militia. On May 21 Brantley joined the Confederate Army when his company (called the Wigfall Rifles) was added to the 15th Mississippi Infantry as Company D, of which he was elected its captain. In the spring of 1862 he was a captain in the 29th Mississippi Infantry, and fought at the Battle of Shiloh on April 6, where he was among 10,000 Confederate casualties.  

That May Brantley was promoted to lieutenant colonel, and on December 13 he was promoted to colonel in command of the 29th Mississippi. He fought during the Battle of Stones River, in which he was wounded again, hit in a shoulder on December 31.

Brantley led his regiment (now part of the Army of Tennessee) during the Battle of Chickamauga from September 19–20, 1863, and with distinction in the Chattanooga Campaign that October and November. In his commander's report about the Battle of Lookout Mountain, Brantley was praised for his conduct:

Brantley's wife Cornelia died during 1863. He led the 29th Mississippi into the Atlanta Campaign in the spring and summer of 1864. In the inconclusive Battle of Resaca on May 13–15, Brantley was again noted for his performance, "commended for gallantry, after leading a charge on the enemy that repulsed Federal assaults three times." During the Battle of Atlanta on July 22, his brigade commander, Col. Samuel Benton, was mortally wounded, hit in his chest and right foot by a shell. Brantley took command of the brigade, and would lead it for the rest of the war. 

On July 26 Brantley was promoted to the rank of brigadier general. He led his brigade during the Franklin-Nashville Campaign in late 1864. At Battle of Franklin on November 30, Brantley's command consisted of the 24th, 27th,  29th, 30th, and the 34th Mississippi Infantry, plus a dismounted cavalry company.

In 1865 Brantley's command and the remnant of the Army of Tennessee participated in the Carolinas Campaign. He surrendered along with Gen. Joseph E. Johnston in North Carolina on April 26. He was paroled on May 1 from Greensboro and returned home to Mississippi.

Postbellum and death
After the war ended in 1865, Brantley resumed his law practice in Mississippi. The widower remarried, to a woman named Julia. They had a son born in 1869, but he died on November 10 that same year; no name was recorded for the infant. 

Brantley was part of a family feud, which resulted in his death by murder. An account of his involvement follows:

Brantley was killed by a shotgun blast at Winona, located in Montgomery County. He was buried in a cemetery "behind the church at Old Greensboro, about three miles north of Tomnolen, Webster County, Mississippi."

See also

List of American Civil War generals (Confederate)

Notes

References
 Eicher, John H., and Eicher, David J., Civil War High Commands, Stanford University Press, 2001, .
 Warner, Ezra J., Generals in Gray: The Lives of the Confederate Commanders, Louisiana State University Press, 1959, .
Wright, Marcus J., General Officers of the Confederate Army, J. M. Carroll & Co., 1983, .
 civilwarreference.com Civil War Reference Network site biography of Brantley.
 theusgenweb.org, US Gen website entry for General William F. Brantley.
 19thalabama.org 19th Alabama Infantry Regiment site Conf. Franklin Order of Battle.
  The 29th Mississippi Infantry Regiment by Jack Taylor, II

Further reading
 Wynne, Ben, A Hard Trip: A History of the 15th Mississippi Infantry, CSA, Mercer University Press, 2003, .

1830 births
1870 deaths
People from Greene County, Alabama
Confederate States Army brigadier generals
People of Alabama in the American Civil War
People of Mississippi in the American Civil War
People from Webster County, Mississippi